Abdul Haq Shafaq is an ethnic Hazara politician in Afghanistan. He is the former governor of
Faryab, Daykundi, Samangan, and Sar-e Pol provinces.

Abdul Haq Shafaq is former commander of the Hezbe Wahdat. After the fall of the Taliban he was appointed governor of Sar-e Pol Province. In 2004, Abdul Haq Shafaq switched to the province of Samangan. He was appointed governor of Takhar in 2019, left that position, and became governor of Sare Pul Province again on 20 June 2021.

See also 
 List of Hazara people

References

Living people
1961 births
Governors of Faryab Province
People from Sar-e Pol Province
Governors of Samangan Province
Hezbe Wahdat politicians
Hazara politicians
Governors of Takhar Province